Olympique de Marseille, also known simply as Marseille or by the abbreviation OM, is a French professional men's football club based in Marseille, Provence-Alpes-Côte d'Azur. Founded in 1899, the club plays in Ligue 1 and have spent most of their history in the top tier of French football. The club has won nine Ligue 1 titles, ten Coupes de France and three Coupes de la Ligue. In 1993, coach Raymond Goethals led the team to become the first and only French club to win the UEFA Champions League,  defeating Milan 1–0 in the final, the first under the UEFA Champions League branding of the tournament. In 2010, Marseille won its first Ligue 1 title in 18 years under the management of former club captain Didier Deschamps.

Marseille's home ground is the 67,394-capacity Stade Vélodrome in the southern part of the city, where they have played since 1937. The club has a large fan-base, having regularly averaged the highest attendance in French football. Marseille's average home gate for the 2018–19 season was 50,361, the highest in Ligue 1. The stadium underwent renovation from 2011 to 2014, increasing its capacity to 67,000 ahead of France's hosting of UEFA Euro 2016. In 2015, the club was ranked 23rd globally in terms of annual revenue, generating €130.5 million.

Marseille traditionally play in an all-white kit with sky blue detailing.

In 1997, Marseille was purchased by Franco-Swiss businessman Robert Louis-Dreyfus. Following his death in 2009, his widow Margarita became the club's majority shareholder in 2010. In 2016, American businessman Frank McCourt bought the club from her, and appointed businessman Jacques-Henri Eyraud as the club president, although he was replaced by Pablo Longoria in 2021.

History

Olympique de Marseille was founded as an omnisport club in 1892 by René Dufaure de Montmirail, a French sports official. Known as Sporting Club, US Phocéenne and Football Club de Marseille in the first five years after its foundation, the club adopted the name Olympique de Marseille in 1899 in honour of the anniversary of Marseille's founding by Greeks from Phocaea some 25 centuries earlier, with the name Olympique, coming from ancient Olympic Games.

At first, rugby union was the most important team sport of the club, the motto Droit au but coming from rugby. Affiliated with the Union des Sociétés Françaises de Sports Athlétiques (USFSA) since 1898, it was only in 1902, thanks to English and German people (according to André Gascard), that football began to be played by Olympique de Marseille. Richer and better organised than other football teams of Marseille (Sporting, Stade, Phocéenne), Olympique de Marseille, then playing at the Stade de l'Huveaune, took the leadership in the city. In 1904, Olympique de Marseille won the first Championnat du Littoral, involving opposing teams from Marseille and its suburbs, and took part in the final rounds of the 11th French championship. At that time, the word "football" applied to rugby, and people used the word "Association" (which would be soccer in North America) for football.

During the 1920s, Olympique de Marseille became an important team in France, winning the Coupe de France in 1924, 1926 and 1927. The team won the French championship in 1929, defeating Club français. The Coupe de France in 1924 was the club's first major title, won against FC Sète, a side that dominated French football at the time. In the '20s, numerous French internationals, such as Jules Dewaquez, Jean Boyer or Joseph Alcazar, played for Marseille. In 1930, Marseille lost against Sète, which would be the winner, in the semi-final round. In 1931, the team became champion of the South-East, with victories against rivals such as Sète. In the Coupe de France, l'OM lost in five matches to Club français, winning the second match that was cancelled due to the disqualification of Marseille striker Vernicke. Even though the 1931–32 season was less successful, Marseille easily entered the professional ranks, becoming a member of the union of professional clubs in 1932. On 13 January 1932 at 9:15 pm, at the Brasserie des Sports, Mr. Dard, Mr. Bison, Dr. Rollenstein, Mr. Etchepare, Mr. Leblanc, Mr. Mille, Mr. Anfosso, Mr. Sabatier, Mr. Seze, Mr. Bazat, Mr. Molteroj and Mr. Pollack elected the following committee:
Honorary presidents: Paul Le Cesne et Fernand Bouisson
President: M. Dard
Vice-Presidents: Mr. Leblanc, Mr. Bison, Mr. Etchepare, Dr. Rollenstein et Mr. Anfosso
general secretary: Mr. Possel-Daydier
Treasurer: Mr Bison (assisted by Mr Ribel).

For the first championship, Division 1 was divided into two pools. Marseille finished second in the first, behind Lille. For its first match of the championship, Marseille defeated the future champion, Lille. In 1937, Marseille won its first professional French championship thanks to goal difference (+30 for Marseille, +17 for Sochaux). The arrival of Vasconcellos made the defence stronger, whereas former goalkeeper Laurent Di Lorto shone with Sochaux and France. In the meantime, Marseille won the Coupe de France in 1935 and 1938 but failed a double success in 1934, due to FC Sète. In 1938, Larbi Benbarek signed with Marseille and became "the black pearl" for the team. World War II would cut his career short. The 1942–43 season was full of records: 100 goals in 30 matches, including 20 in one match (20–2 against Avignon), in which Aznar scored nine goals, including the first eight (Marseille was leading 8–0), playing only 70 minutes. Aznar scored 45 goals in 30 matches, plus 11 in cup games, for a record of 56 goals in 38 matches. With the minots (young players) of the moment (Scotti, Robin, Dard, Pironti), Marseille won the cup in two matches against Bordeaux (4–0). In 1948, thanks to a draw against Sochaux, Marseille became the champions of France. The two last victories at the Stade Vélodrome against Roubaix (6–0) and Metz (6–3) were important, as Aznar and Robin's returned in spring.

In 1952, Marseille were about to be relegated, but Gunnar Andersson saved his team, finishing as top scorer with 31 goals. The team won (5–3) on aggregate against Valenciennes. The same year, Marseille lost at the Stade Vélodrome against Saint-Étienne 10–3, but Liberati was injured. In 1953, Gunnar Andersson would take the record of goals scored in one season with 35. Marseille was runner-up in the Coupe de France (Nice won 2–1) in 1954 and the Coupe Drago in 1957 to (Lens which won 3–1). Marseille were struggling at the time and were relegated for the first time in 1959. From 1959 to 1965, the team played in the second division, except during the 1962–63 season, finishing 20th out of 20 in the first division. In 1965, Marcel Leclerc became president.

1965–1986: Leclerc era and crisis

The first period of Olympique de Marseille's domination of the French League started in the early 1970s under Marcel Leclerc's presidency (1965–1972). His ambition allowed Marseille to return to the First division in 1965–66. They went on to win the Coupe de France in 1969 as well as the First division in 1971 with a record of 44 goals by Josip Skoblar, helped by Roger Magnusson. The arrival of Georges Carnus and Bernard Bosquier from Saint-Étienne helped them to win the Ligue 1 and the Coupe de France in 1972. Marseille played in the European Cup in 1971–72 and 1972–73, but were knocked-out by Ajax of Johan Cruyff and Juventus, respectively. However, success was not to last. Marcel Leclerc was forced to leave the club on 19 July 1972. The President was a stubborn man, and he threatened the league to withdraw his professional team from Ligue 1 because the federation refused to accept three foreign players per team (Leclerc wanted to acquire the Hungarian star Zoltán Varga but he had already the maximum number of two foreigners in his team). Marseille decided, instead of following Leclerc against the league, to fire him. Then followed an era of crisis, with Marseille only winning a Coupe de France in 1976 and being relegated to the second division, where they played with a bunch of young local players: the Minots who allowed the team to return to First division in 1984. Éric Di Meco was one of them.

1986–1996: Tapie era, bribery scandal, and decline

On 12 April 1986, Bernard Tapie became president, thanks to Marseille mayor Gaston Defferre, and promptly built the greatest team seen in France up to that point. His first signings were Karl-Heinz Forster and Alain Giresse, who were bought after the 1986 FIFA World Cup. Tapie signed a large number of highly regarded players over the next few years in his pursuit of the European Cup, such as Jean-Pierre Papin, Chris Waddle, Klaus Allofs, Enzo Francescoli, Abedi Pele, Didier Deschamps, Basile Boli, Marcel Desailly, Rudi Völler, Tony Cascarino and Eric Cantona as well as appointing high-profile coaches like Franz Beckenbauer, Gérard Gili and Raymond Goethals. Between 1989 and 1992, Olympique de Marseille won four league titles in a row and the French Cup. The team also reached the Champions Cup final for the first time in 1991, losing on penalties to Red Star Belgrade. The highlight of the club's history is winning the new format Champions League in 1993. Basile Boli scored the only goal against Italy's Milan in the final held in Munich's Olympic Stadium. That triumph was the first time ever for a French club and it made Didier Deschamps and Fabien Barthez the youngest captain and goalkeeper, respectively, to capture the title.

This triumph, however, was followed by a decade of decline. In 1994, due to financial irregularities and a match-fixing scandal involving then-president Bernard Tapie, they suffered enforced relegation to the second division, where Marseille stayed for two years before returning to the First division. Moreover, they lost their 1992–93 Division 1 title and the right to play in the 1993–94 UEFA Champions League, the 1993 European Super Cup and the 1993 Intercontinental Cup. This scandal, called l'affaire VA-OM (VA for Union Sportive Valenciennes-Anzin and OM for Olympique de Marseille), was exposed by Valenciennes, whose players Jacques Glassmann, Jorge Burruchaga and Christophe Robert were contacted by Marseille player Jean-Jacques Eydelie to let OM win and, more importantly, not to injure any OM player ahead of the UEFA Champions League final.

1996–2009: Return to success

Marseille returned to the top flight in 1996 with backing from Adidas's CEO Robert Louis-Dreyfus. He chose Rolland Courbis as coach, signed Fabrizio Ravanelli, Laurent Blanc, and Andreas Köpke, and Marseille finished 11th for his return. For the 1998–99 season, the team celebrated their centenary and built a team of stars: Robert Pires, Florian Maurice, and Christophe Dugarry, culminating in a second-place finish in the French championship, behind Bordeaux and an appearance in the UEFA Cup Final in 1999, losing to Parma. Courbis left the team in November 1999 after a poor start to the season.

The closest Marseille got to another trophy was when they reached the UEFA Cup Final in 2004, impressively beating Dnipro, Internazionale, Liverpool, and Newcastle United along the way. But they were beaten in the final by newly crowned Spanish champions Valencia and once again fans were forced to continue waiting for the next trophy to come along. In 2005, Marseille succeeded in winning the Intertoto Cup, beating the likes of Lazio and Deportivo de La Coruña in doing so, and earning another shot at the UEFA Cup.

In January 2007, there was negotiation between Louis-Dreyfus and Jack Kachkar, a Canadian doctor and businessman (CEO of pharmaceutical company Inyx), about selling the club. As Jack Kachkar took too much time to buy the team, Louis-Dreyfus decided on 22 March 2007 not to sell to the Canadian businessman. Another close call to glory was in the Coupe de France final against Sochaux in May 2007. However, they lost on penalties after a 2–2 draw after extra time, to the disappointment of everyone linked with the club, but they soon wiped all that disappointment away by qualifying for the 2007–08 UEFA Champions League group stage after securing second place with one game to spare.

In the Champions League, Marseille became the first French team to win at Anfield when they beat 2007 runners-up Liverpool 1–0, and the team took six out of six points from their opening two games. They only drew one more match, and in a winner-takes-all final group game they lost 4–0 to Liverpool, who became the first English team to win at the Stade Vélodrome. Marseille, coming third in the Champions League Group A, then joined the UEFA Cup.
Marseille finished the 2008–09 season with a second-place finish in Ligue 1, following a tight race with Bordeaux for the title.  This earned them direct entry into the group stages of the UEFA Champions League, their third consecutive season in the competition. Marseille won the 2010 Coupe de la Ligue Final beating Bordeaux 3–1 at the Stade de France in March 2010. This was their first major title since their Champions League triumph 17 years earlier. Two months later, Marseille won their first league championship for 18 years with two games to spare after beating Rennes 3–1. Marseille defeated rivals Paris Saint-Germain (PSG) on penalties to win the 2010 Trophée des Champions at Stade 7 Novembre in Rades, Tunisia, before the season began. Marseille then became the first team to win back-to-back Coupe de la Ligue successes when they won the 2011 edition by beating Montpellier 1–0 on 23 April. Before that, they qualified for the last 16 of the UEFA Champions League for the first time since their historic success, but lost 2–1 at Old Trafford to Manchester United and also set a Champions League record by thrashing Žilina 7–0 in what was the biggest away win in the competition's history. In 2011, Marseille lost the Ligue 1 championship title but qualified for the UEFA Champions League for the fifth time in a row, a club record. On 27 July 2011, Marseille won the 2011 Trophée des Champions title by beating Lille 5–4 at Stade de Tanger in Morocco. The result was significant as OM were 3–1 down with five minutes to go, only to embark on a remarkable comeback which saw 5 goals scored in the last five minutes with André Ayew scoring a hat-trick.

2009–2014: Deschamps, Baup, Anigo
The club struggled in the 2011–12 season, going to the bottom of the Ligue 1 table after six matches. Nevertheless, Marseille rebounded, winning 3–0 against Borussia Dortmund in the Champions League, as well as a 3–0 success over rivals PSG in November of that year. Marseille ended 2011 with a good sequence, also qualifying for the knockout stages of the Champions League for the second season running.

In February 2012, Marseille embarked on 13 games without victory, but rallied to qualify for the quarter-finals of the Champions League for the first time since winning the competition in 1993. Despite an indifferent club form, OM lost to eventual finalists Bayern Munich, and slumped to an overall tenth-place finish in Ligue 1. However, the club retained the Coupe de la Ligue for the third year running, beating Lyon 1–0 in the Final.

In the summer of 2012, Deschamps resigned, and later took on the France job. Elie Baup took over, leading the club to a surprising second-place finish in the 2012–13 season despite selling multiple key players, including Loïc Rémy, César Azpilicueta and Stéphane Mbia. Marseille returned to the Champions League, spending close to €40 million on the likes of Dimitri Payet, Florian Thauvin and Giannelli Imbula. The club were top of the table at the end of August 2013, but OM proceeded to lose all six games in Europe, suffering the ignominy of becoming the first French team, and the biggest European team to date, to have picked up zero points in a Champions League group stage.

Baup was sacked on 7 December 2013, following the 1–0 defeat to Nantes at Stade Velodrome. He was replaced on an interim basis by José Anigo. In Anigo's brief tenure, OM went out of the two cups, and struggled, leading to continued protests and jeers by fans. The club finished sixth in the 2014 season, missing out on an important European competition place for the first time in ten years. Anigo left the club soon after, taking on an ambassadorial/scouting role in North Africa, his first post outside of the city for more than four decades.

2014–2015: Bielsa era and stagnation

Marseille announced on 2 May 2014 an agreement with Marcelo Bielsa, who took the managerial hotseat. Bielsa was the club's first Argentine coach and the first coach to lead the team into the renovated Velodrome, which opened in August with a fixture against Montpellier. In Bielsa's first season in charge, the club led the league table for seven months but finished fourth and thus qualified for the UEFA Europa League. June 2015 saw three key players leave the club—André-Pierre Gignac and André Ayew left the club for Tigres UANL and Swansea City, respectively, after their contracts expired, while Dimitri Payet left to join West Ham United for a €15 million transfer fee.

After a solid pre-season, which included a 2–0 win over Juventus in the Robert Louis-Dreyfus Trophy and the signature of nine players, Bielsa resigned from his post, just minutes after the first Ligue 1 game of the 2015–16 season against Caen. Marseille lost the game 1–0, and Bielsa shocked the footballing world with his unexpected decision, citing a lack of trust with the club's management, who he said had reneged on a previously agreed contract extension. Bielsa's departure reportedly left his players in a state of shock, many of whom learnt the news via social media in the dressing room.

On 19 August 2015, Míchel was announced as Marseille's new coach. He endured a frustrating season, with OM failing to win a home game in Ligue 1 for more than six months. Following a number of poor performances, Míchel was sacked in April by club owner Margarita Louis Dreyfus, citing poor conduct as the team's coach. The sacking came on the eve of the club's Coupe de France semi-final fixture. As in 2015, Passi was installed as the caretaker coach. Under his direction, Marseille reached the Coupe de France final for the first time in nine years, losing out 4–2 to rivals Paris Saint-Germain. OM would finish the league season in 13th, the club's worst league finish in 15 years.

In the summer of 2016, Marseille once more sold off a number of key players to meet financial obligations and to clear its wage bill ahead of an impending takeover. Steve Mandanda, the club's long-serving captain ended eight years at the club and moved to Crystal Palace, Nicolas N'Koulou moved to Lyon, while striker Michy Batshuayi was sold to Chelsea for a club record €40 million.

2016–present: New ownership and revival
Marseille began the 2016–17 Ligue 1 season with interim manager Franck Passi at the helm. On 29 August 2016, it was announced that American businessman Frank McCourt had agreed to buy the club from Margarita Louis-Dreyfus. The purchase deal was completed for a reported price tag of €45 million on 17 October 2016. Within the next few days, McCourt appointed Jacques-Henri Eyraud as the club's president, Rudi Garcia as the manager of the club's first team and Andoni Zubizarreta as director of sport.

On 3 May 2018, Marseille reached the final of the 2017–18 UEFA Europa League after eliminating Red Bull Salzburg in the semi-finals 3–2 on aggregate, 14 years after its last final in a European competition in 2004 against Valencia. However, they lost the final to Atlético Madrid.

In the 2019–20 Ligue 1 season, Andre Villas-Boas became head coach. Marseille finished second after the season was ended early due to the coronavirus pandemic, thus qualifying for the 2020–21 UEFA Champions League for the first time since 2013–14.

In February 2021, after this string of losses, conflict with players, and lack of support from sporting director Pablo Longoria and President Jacques-Henri Eyraud, head coach Andre Villas-Boas offered to resign, three days after a violent riot by protesting Marseille fans at the team training grounds had forced postponement of a league match with Rennes. Marseille sacked Villas-Boas, and replaced the coach with Argentine Jorge Sampaoli. The club also appointed Pablo Longoria to be the team's new president, replacing Jacques-Henri Eyraud, as Eyraud had also been a target of the ire of Marseille fans.

In January 2022, Marseille player Pape Gueye was banned from playing for 4 months by FIFA, while Marseille were given a ban on making transfers in both the summer 2022 and January 2023 transfer windows, and forced to pay €2.5 million to Watford. This came after the English club brought litigation against Marseille over the transfer of Gueye, who had originally signed a contract with Watford, but after finding out his agent had lied to him about the salary on offer, broke the contract and signed with Marseille. Marseille appealed FIFA's decision. In the 2021–22 Ligue 1 season, Marseille finished in second place, securing Champions League football for the first time since 2020. In the final matchday, they were helped by Lens's equalizing goal in the final moments of a 2–2 draw with Monaco.

Le Classique

Le Classique is a football match that is contested between Paris Saint-Germain and Olympique de Marseille. The term Classique is modelled on El Clásico, contested between Barcelona and Real Madrid. Like all the game's major rivalries, the antipathy between PSG and Marseille extends outside the pitch. The French clásico has a historical, cultural and social importance that makes it more than just a football game, pitching capital against province, and the traditional wealth and high culture of Paris against the industrial and cosmopolitan traditions of Marseille. However, this rivalry appears only in the 1990s, where it is promoted by the respective owners of PSG - Canal+, the TV channel which broadcast the Ligue 1 football matches - and Olympique de Marseile - Bernard Tapie, also owner of the sports company Adidas -, for obvious marketing reasons. It is sometimes seen as 'the favourite son' of French football against its enfants terribles. With PSG being located in the north in the French capital and Marseille located along the Mediterranean coast, the rivalry is often referred to as "the North versus the South." PSG and Marseille are two of just three French clubs to have won major European trophies, PSG having won the UEFA Cup Winners' Cup in 1996 and Marseille won the UEFA Champions League in 1993, and they were the two dominant forces before the emergence of Lyon at the beginning of the 21st century. However, despite their recent ups and downs, PSG and Marseille remain fierce rivals, giving this match a special atmosphere. "Le Classique" is also known as "Le Classico".

Stadium

From 1904 to 1937, Marseille played at the Stade de l'Huveaune, a stadium owned by the club, in contrast to its current stadium. L'Huveaune, once named Stade Fernand Buisson in honour of a former rugby player of the club who became a member of the French National Assembly,  was renovated at the beginning of the twenties, thanks to supporter's financial help. In 1937, l'OM moved into the much larger Stade Vélodrome after compelling the city of Marseille to lower its rent. The club made use of the Stade de l'Huveaune again during the renovation of the Vélodrome for Euro 1984, during the 1982/83 season. The Vélodrome again underwent redevelopment in time for the 1998 World Cup and was transformed into an immense ground composed of two Curva ends (Virage Nord and Virage Sud – North Curve and South Curve) which house the supporters groups as well as the main stand, Jean Bouin, and the imposing Ganay stand. In a third renovation, in preparation for Euro 2016, the municipality covered the stands with a roof, and increased its capacity to 67,000 to host the Euro 2016 games.

Before the start of each home game the song "Jump" by Van Halen is heard.
When a goal is scored by Marseille in their home matches the song "Come with Me" by Puff Daddy is played.

Kits and crest 

Marseille's traditional kit colours were white shirts and shorts with blue socks until 1986. Since 1986, Marseille have played with white shirts, white shorts and white socks, and the blue color became lighter due to Adidas marketing but in 2012–2013, the club returned to its original kit, wearing blue socks.

Club founder René Dufaure de Montmirail drew inspiration from his personal seal, which featured interlaced letters "D" and "M", to create the club's first badge. The club's motto, "Droit au but", dates from the days when the club's main sport was rugby, under the name "Football Club de Marseille". The original badge featured an ornate letter "M" superimposed over an "O", with the club motto draped across the glyph. The logo persisted for three decades, until 1935, when an art deco shield was adopted, with a simple "M" encased within the "O". In 1972, OM redesigned its logo, this time preferring a complex "M" letterform. In 1986, the club re-adopted its first badge; the logo evolved slightly over the next few decades, gaining a star in 1993 to commemorate the club's UEFA Champions League trophy. To commemorate the club's 100th anniversary in 1999, a variant featuring a golden "O" and a turquoise "M" was used; a similar 110th anniversary logo was used during the 2009–10 season. The most recent form was revealed on 17 February 2004; the "O" and "M" are rendered as a single unit in turquoise without shading or borders, and the logo is capped by the golden star representing the victory in the Champions League and sits above. The club's motto Droit Au But (French for "Straight to the Goal") also rendered in gold appears under the badge.

Kit suppliers and shirt sponsors

Supporters

Virage Nord De Peretti
The atmosphere in the Stade Vélodrome is created by the dominance of OM's own supporters who are located in the Curva style ends behind both goals. The North Curve is home to the Marseille Trop Puissant, Fanatics, and Dodger's supporters associations who buy up the tickets at the start of each season and sell them on to their members. The Virage Nord is next to the away enclosure, which is protected by high fences. In 2002, the Virage Nord was officially given the name of Patrice de Peretti (1972–2000), the late founder and leader of the supporters group Marseille Trop Puissant (MTP). In 2010, the third kit of OM was a tribute to MTP, with the red, yellow and green colours of Africa, symbols of this left-wing curva. In 2018, owner Frank McCourt and president Jacques-Henri Eyraud decided to exclude the Yankee Nord due to a number of delictuous activities, especially concerning tickets ; they therefore forbid them to sell the said tickets, and the association is no longer officially recognized by the club.

Virage Sud Chevalier Roze
The virage is named after Nicolas Roze, a noble who distinguished himself in particular by creating a hospital in Marseille during the Great Plague of Marseille in 1720. As with the Virage Nord, the South Curve is controlled by supporter's associations with the Commando Ultra '84, the first group of ultra supporters in France created in August 1984, and the South Winners dominating the central section and Club Central des Supporters filling the remaining sections of the stand.
The 2007/08 third shirt of OM was a tribute to South Winners fans whose colours are orange, as they are traditionally left wing fans.

AEK Athens, AS Livorno and Sampdoria

There is a strong relationship between AEK Athens, AS Livorno, UC Sampdoria and Marseille. Marseille fans often lift banners and create choreography in support of the fellow teams.
At the opposite, also because of different political opinions they use to argue with many SS Lazio fans.

Players

First-team squad

Out on loan

Reserve squad

Player of the season

Personnel

Technical staff

{| class=wikitable
|-
! Position !! Name
|-
|Manager||   Igor Tudor
|-
| rowspan=2| Assistant managers ||  Hari Vukas
|-
|  Jacques Abardonado
|-
|Video analyst ||  Giuseppe Maiuri
|-
|Goalkeeping coach ||  Antonello Brambilla
|-
|Fitness coach ||  Carlo Spignoli
|-
| rowspan=2| Club doctors ||  Abdou Sbihi
|-
|  Jean-Baptiste Grisoli
|-
|Assistant Doctor ||  Mathias Giustiniani
|-
| rowspan=5| Physiotherapists ||  Maxime Matton
|-
|  Youssef Rahou
|-
|  Pierre Vespignani
|-
|  Stéphane Ré
|-
|  Yannick Dyduch
|-
|Nutritionist ||  Cécile Capdeville
|-
|Osteopath ||  Gilles Davin

Management

{| class=wikitable
|-
!Position
!Staff
|-
|Owner ||  Frank McCourt
|-
|Majority Shareholder ||  McCourt Global LLC
|-
|President ||  Pablo Longoria
|-
|Sporting Director ||  Javier Ribalta
|-
|Technical Director ||  David Friio
|-
|General Manager ||  Laurent Colette
|-
|Secretary-GeneralLegal Council ||  Alexandre Miahle
|-
|Chief Financial Officer ||  Stéphane Tessier
|-
|Director of Strategy ||  Pedro Iriondo
|-
|Director of Communications ||  Jacques Cardoze
|-
|Director of Academy ||  Marco Otero

Honours
Marseille have won the French national championship nine times; with nine Ligue 1 titles they are behind only Saint-Étienne and Paris Saint-Germain, who both have ten. However, the first championship won by Marseille was in 1929, before the professional era of French football. Marseille also have the second best record in the Coupe de France, with ten titles. Marseille have achieved two championship and cup "Doubles", in 1972 and 1989. They are the only French club to win the UEFA Champions League, doing so in 1993.

Domestic competitions 

 French Championship / Ligue 1
Winners (9): 1936–37, 1947–48, 1970–71, 1971–72, 1988–89, 1989–90, 1990–91, 1991–92, 2009–10
Runners-up (13): 1937–38, 1938–39, 1969–70, 1974–75, 1986–87, 1993–94, 1998–99, 2006–07, 2008–09, 2010–11, 2012–13, 2019–20, 2021–22
 Ligue 2
 Winners (1): 1994–95
 Runners-up (2): 1965–66, 1995–96
 Coupe de France
 Winners (10): 1923–24, 1925–26, 1926–27, 1934–35, 1937–38, 1942–43, 1968–69, 1971–72, 1975–76, 1988–89
 Runners-up (9): 1933–34, 1939–40, 1953–54, 1985–86, 1986–87, 1990–91, 2005–06, 2006–07, 2015–16
 Coupe de la Ligue
 Winners (3): 2009–10, 2010–11, 2011–12
Trophée des Champions
 Winners (3): 1971, 2010, 2011
Runners-up (3): 1969, 1972, 2020
Coupe Charles Drago
 Winners (1): 1957

International competitions 

 European Cup/UEFA Champions League
 Winners (1): 1992–93
 Runners-up (1): 1990–91
 UEFA Cup/UEFA Europa League
 Runners-up (3): 1998–99, 2003–04, 2017–18
 UEFA Intertoto Cup
 Winners (1): 2005

Ballon d'Or
The following players received the Ballon d'Or award whilst playing for Olympique de Marseille:
 Jean-Pierre Papin – 1991

Two other former Ballon d'Or winners were hired by Olympique de Marseille: George Weah played for Marseille in 2000–01 after winning the Ballon d'Or in 1995 and Franz Beckenbauer coached the team for six months in 1990.

European Golden Shoe
The following players have won the European Golden Shoe whilst playing for Olympique de Marseille:
 Josip Skoblar (44 goals) – 1971

UNFP Player of the Year
The following players have won the UNFP Player of the Year whilst playing for Olympique de Marseille:
 Didier Drogba – 2004

UNFP Young Player of the Year
The following players have won the UNFP Young Player of the Year whilst playing for Olympique de Marseille:
 Franck Ribéry – 2006
 Samir Nasri – 2007
 William Saliba – 2022

Footnotes

References

External links 

 Official site

 
Association football clubs established in 1899
G-14 clubs
Football clubs in Marseille
1899 establishments in France
UEFA Champions League winning clubs
M
Ligue 1 clubs